Selden Island is a 408-acre island in the Potomac River, located about  WNW of Washington, DC. It is about 4 km long and 0.4–0.5 km wide (2.5 x 1/4–1/3 miles). Although it is located within Montgomery County, Maryland, the only road access is via a bridge connecting it to the Loudoun County, Virginia side of the river.

Archaeological evidence indicates the island has been a site of human activity since the Early Woodland period, around 1000 BCE. A characteristic type of pottery known as Selden Island ware dates from this period. It is also the site of a significant Late Woodland period settlement known as the Walker Prehistoric Village, which was added to the National Register of Historic Places in 1975.

In 2002, following the diagnosis of two Loudoun County teenagers with malaria, mosquitoes from the island were found to carry the Plasmodium vivax malarial parasite.

In 2004, Selden Island was purchased by the Howard Hughes Medical Institute as an addition to the Janelia Farm Research Campus. It was formerly leased as a sod farm.

References

Archaeological sites in Montgomery County, Maryland
Islands of the Potomac River
River islands of Maryland
Landforms of Montgomery County, Maryland